Chenar Zahedan (also Romanized as Chenār Zāhedān; also known as Chenār Dozd) is a village in Sarchehan Rural District, Sarchehan District, Bavanat County, Fars Province, Iran. At the 2006 census, its population was 101, in 23 families.

References 

Populated places in Sarchehan County